Waotu or Te Waotu is a rural community in the South Waikato District and Waikato region of New Zealand's North Island.

The area includes a landscape of rolling dairy farms on the site of a former ancient forest. Some native bush remains, including the first privately natural feature in New Zealand protected by covenant.

History and culture

Early history

The Ngāti Kahupungapunga tribe were the first to settle the area. Ngāti Raukawa followed in the 16th century.

Pirauiti, situated at Waotu, is one of about 13 pā or fortified villages along the Waikato River. It is of significance to Ngāti Huri and is believed to date from the 14th or 15th centuries. It has been quarried and extensively damaged by J Swap Contracting.

European settlers arrived in the late 19th century, clearing most of the land for farmland by the end of the century.

A school was established at Waotu in 1886 and relocated to its current site in 1969.

20th century

Young men from Waotu made a long journey into Hamilton in 1915 to enlist for service in World War I.

The Duxfield Reserve picnic site was donated by councillor John Duxfield in 1968.

The  Jim Barnett Reserve, established in 1992, features Totara and Rimu. An ancient bush survived at this site during the Taupō Volcano eruption of 186 CE, but much of it was harvested for timber during the 1920s.

A further  site was cleared for farming in the 1970s. This prompted a neighbouring couple, Gordon and Celia Stephenson, to co-found the Queen Elizabeth II National Trust in 1977. In 1979 they became the first landowners in New Zealand to covenant private land, opting to protect 4 hectares of remaining native bush on their farm.

21st century

English student Matthew Purchase was shot during a hunting trip in Waotu in 2009. He survived with serious injuries.

Police uncovered a substantial cannabis growing operation in Waotu in January 2019.

Marae

Waotu has two tribal meeting grounds for local Ngāti Raukawa hapū: Matiti Pā and Waotu Centennial Hall is a meeting place for Ngāti Maihi, and Pikitū Marae and Huri meetinghouse are affiliated with Ngāti Huri. Pikitū Marae operates a worm farm and strict recycling programme.

In October 2020, the Government committed $109,254 from the Provincial Growth Fund to upgrade the Pikitū Marae, creating an estimated 10 jobs.

Education

Former principal Bruce Darroch was jailed on child pornography charges in 2016. His offending related to 11 boys at the school.

The school was as at risk of overcrowding in 2017.

References

South Waikato District
Populated places in Waikato
Populated places on the Waikato River